Rosemount–McIver Park Historic District is a national historic district located at Sanford, Lee County, North Carolina. It encompasses 169 contributing buildings, 1 contributing site, and 1 contributing structure in two residential neighborhoods of Sanford.  The district includes notable examples of Colonial Revival, Tudor Revival and Queen Anne style architecture, with buildings largely dated between about 1900 to the early 1940s.  The houses are characterized as one story, story-and-a-half, or two stories in height, ranging in scale from compact bungalows and cottages to manorial residences.

It was listed on the National Register of Historic Places in 1997.

References

Historic districts on the National Register of Historic Places in North Carolina
Colonial Revival architecture in North Carolina
Tudor Revival architecture in North Carolina
Queen Anne architecture in North Carolina
Buildings and structures in Lee County, North Carolina
National Register of Historic Places in Lee County, North Carolina